Lumley Branch is a stream in Dade County in the U.S. state of Missouri. It is a tributary of the Sac River.

Lumley Branch most likely was named after William Lumley, an early settler.

See also
List of rivers of Missouri

References

Rivers of Dade County, Missouri
Rivers of Missouri